Emil Sildnes (born 29 January 1993) is a Norwegian footballer who plays as a midfielder for HamKam.

Career
Sildnes started his senior career with HamKam in 2009. In the opening round of the 2014 season, he broke his leg. He returned to football with Oppsal in 2016, before moving to Strømmen in 2017. After two seasons with Strømmen, he returned to HamKam in 2019. On 2 April 2022, he made his Eliteserien debut in a 2–2 draw against Lillestrøm.

References

External links

1993 births
Living people
Sportspeople from Hamar
Association football midfielders
Norwegian footballers
Norway youth international footballers
Hamarkameratene players
Oppsal IF players
Strømmen IF players
Norwegian Second Division players
Norwegian First Division players
Eliteserien players